Jia Prefecture or Jiazhou may refer to:

 Jia Prefecture (Sichuan) (嘉州),  a prefecture in imperial China in modern Leshan, Sichuan, China
 Jia Prefecture (Shaanxi) (葭州), a prefecture in imperial China in modern Yulin, Shaanxi, now Jia County